Elce Creek is a stream in the U.S. state of turner county South Dakota. Elce Creek has the name of T. C. Elce, a pioneer settler. Elce creek is at a elevation of 386 meters (1266 feet)

with the coordinates of 43.3597° N, 97.0320° W. Sioux Falls, firesteel creek, james river, East Vermillion Lake, rock river and split rock creek are nearby elce creek.

See also
List of rivers of South Dakota
south dakota
Turner county

References

Rivers of McCook County, South Dakota
Rivers of Minnehaha County, South Dakota
Rivers of Turner County, South Dakota
Rivers of South Dakota